G protein-regulated inducer of neurite outgrowth 2 is a protein that in humans is encoded by the GPRIN2 gene.

References

Further reading